Prewett is a surname. Notable people with the surname include:

Prewett family, fictional characters in J. K. Rowling's Harry Potter series
Gideon and Fabian Prewett, Molly Weasley's brothers

Frank Prewett (1893–1962), Canadian poet, who spent most of his life in the United Kingdom
Park Prewett Hospital, psychiatric hospital northwest of Basingstoke, England, which operated from 1917 until 1997

See also
Prue Watt
Pruett